Kosmos 107 ( meaning Cosmos 107) or Zenit-2 No.34 was a Soviet, first generation, low resolution, optical film-return reconnaissance satellite launched in 1966.

Kosmos 107 was launched by a Vostok-2 rocket flying from Site 31/6 at the Baikonur Cosmodrome. The launch took place at 08:52 GMT on 10 February 1966, and following its successful arrival in orbit the spacecraft received its Kosmos designation; along with the International Designator 1966-010A and the Satellite Catalog Number 01998.

After eight days in orbit, Kosmos 107 was deorbited, with its return capsule descending under parachute, landing at 06:29 GMT on 18 February 1966, and recovered by Soviet force.

References

Kosmos satellites
Spacecraft launched in 1966
Spacecraft which reentered in 1966
Zenit-2 satellites
1966 in the Soviet Union